Coast Unified School District is located on the Central Coast of California in the community of Cambria. The district consists of one K-5 elementary school, one 6–8 middle school, one traditional 9–12 high school and one alternative high school. There are approximately 850 students enrolled K-12. The District also serves the communities of San Simeon to the north and Cayucos to the south (grades 9–12) as well as surrounding rural areas.

The area's economy is primarily based on the tourism and agriculture industries. The economic status of the local population is very diverse and includes low, middle and high-income families. 

In 2012 a group of independent parents and community members formed a committee to improve the school district through better definition of School Board and Superintendent roles.  This group was titled the Concerned Citizens for Cambrian Education.

References

External links
Coast Unified School District website
Coast Union High School Drama website

School districts in San Luis Obispo County, California